Charlie Holt is the bishop coadjutor-elect of the Episcopal Diocese of Florida. Whether he will become bishop is in doubt. His election requires the consent of a majority of other diocese. Several church groups have urged that consent not be given. 

He was elected for the first time on May 14, 2022, but due electoral irregularities renounced his election on August 19, 2022. He was elected a second time on November 19, 2022. 

At the time of his first election, he was associate rector of teaching and formation at the Church of St. John the Divine in Houston, Texas. He joined the staff of the Diocese of Florida on August 1, 2022, while objections to his first election were being adjudicated. His work for the diocese includes enhancing prison ministry, supporting Episcopal schools, and planning the future of the diocese's camp and conference center.

First Election 
There were five candidates in the first election. Holt was elected on the third ballot. A formal objection to the election process was filed with the presiding bishop of the Episcopal Church. The objection to the election process claimed that the required clergy quorum for election was not met and that there were procedural and technical flaws with the remote voting process. The diocese's official response to the objection to the process defended the process and charged that the objector's motivation was the result of the process (Holt's election) and not the process itself. The Court of Review of the Episcopal Church released its judgement on the objections on August 15, 2022, and sided with the objectors on most counts. The diocese has thanked the court for its work, but not yet responded to the findings.

Independent of the review process, some Episcopalians have urged other dioceses to withhold their consent to Holt's election. This is a required part of the election process, but usually a formality.  The appeal to deny consent focuses on Holt's views on same-sex marriage and comments about LGBTQ+ people and Black people. His comments regarding race came in the context of the shooting of Trayvon Martin in Sanford, Florida. At that time, Holt was serving a nearby church.

Holt originally did not comment on the objection to the election process pointing out that he was not involved in organizing the election. He has responded in letter and video to the concerns voiced about his views on race and LGBTQ+ people. He has reiterated that he will abide by the polity of the Episcopal Church and not prohibit churches that wish to from performing same-sex weddings and will welcome LGBTQ+ people into the discernment process for ordination. Regarding race, he has explained, that “a larger message intended to be an example of inclusion was reduced to a soundbite suggesting that I support exclusion." He has also shared a series of letters written in support of him by Black pastors in the Sanford area.

Holt rescinded his acceptance of the election on August 19, 2022.

Second Election 
On August 26, 2022, the diocese announced there would be a second election. It took place November 19, 2022, at Camp Weed. Holt was one of three candidates. The others were Miguel Rosada and Beth Tjoflat. Holt was elected on the first ballot. On November 28, 2022, 29 lay and clergy delegates to the convention filed objections to this second election with the diocese. The diocese forwarded them to the presiding bishop for investigation by a court of review and received the report on February 16, 2023. The standing committee of the Diocese of Florida is preparing a response, which, when ready, will be shared with the court of review report. Once the report is released, other dioceses will have 120 days to express their consent to the election. A majority of diocesan standing committees and bishops with jurisdiction must consent to the election before Holt can be consecrated. Deputies of Color, group of members of the House of Deputies has also released a statement urging dioceses to withhold their consent. Since his election, Holt has emphasized that as bishop he will not stand in the way of parishes or clergy who wish to hold same-sex weddings. 

A scheduled date of consecration has not been announced.

References 

Living people
Episcopal bishops of Florida
University of Florida alumni
Year of birth missing (living people)